Leonardo Felipe Valencia Rossel (born 25 April 1991) is a Chilean footballer who plays as a midfielder for Chilean club Cobresal.

Career

Unión La Calera

Palestino

Universidad de Chile (loan)
On 9 July 2015 Valencia returned to Universidad de Chile, this time on a one-year loan deal until the end of the 2015–16 season.

Botafogo
On 11 July 2017 Valencia officially signed with Brazilian Série A club Botafogo a three-year contract.

Colo Colo
On 23 December 2019, it was announced that Valencia signed for Chilean club Colo Colo.

International career
Valencia got his first call up to the senior Chile side for 2018 FIFA World Cup qualifiers against Ecuador and Peru in October 2016.

On 13 June 2017 Valencia scored his first international goal for Chile in a Friendly against Romania at Cluj Arena.

Career statistics

Club
(Correct .)

International

International goals
Scores and results list Chile's goal tally first.

Honours

Club
 Universidad de Chile
 Copa Chile (1): 2015
 Supercopa de Chile (1): 2015

Botafogo
 Campeonato Carioca: 2018

 Colo-Colo
 Copa Chile (1): 2019

International
Chile
 Confederations Cup (1): Runner-up 2017
 China Cup (1): 2017

Notes

In isolation, Valencia is pronounced

References

External links
 
 

1991 births
Living people
People from Santiago
People from Santiago Province, Chile
People from Santiago Metropolitan Region
Footballers from Santiago
Chilean footballers
Association football midfielders
Universidad de Chile footballers
Deportes Melipilla footballers
Unión La Calera footballers
Club Deportivo Palestino footballers
Santiago Wanderers footballers
Botafogo de Futebol e Regatas players
Colo-Colo footballers
Deportes La Serena footballers
Chilean Primera División players
Campeonato Brasileiro Série A players
Expatriate footballers in Brazil
2017 FIFA Confederations Cup players
Chile international footballers
Chilean expatriate footballers
Chilean expatriates in Brazil
Chilean expatriate sportspeople in Brazil